The Buttercup Chain is a 1970 British drama film directed by Robert Ellis Miller and starring Hywel Bennett, Jane Asher, and Leigh Taylor-Young. It was entered into the 1970 Cannes Film Festival.
The film is an adaptation of the 1967 novel of the same title by Janice Elliott. It was shot at Shepperton Studios and on location in England, Sweden and Spain. The film's sets were designed by the veteran art director Wilfred Shingleton.

Plot
France and Margaret are cousins, born on the same day to twin sisters. They grow up feeling a bond as if brother and sister. When he returns to London from boarding school, France and Margaret make a pact in which each finds a suitable romantic partner for the other. But when they go away to the countryside with Manny and Fred, a strange incestuous impulse seems to exist between the cousins, while Manny also must deal with a pregnancy.

Cast
 Hywel Bennett as France
 Leigh Taylor-Young as Manny
 Jane Asher as Margaret
 Sven-Bertil Taube as Fred
 Clive Revill as George
 Roy Dotrice as Martin Carr-Gibbons
 Michael Elphick as The Driver
 Jonathan Burn as Alberto
 Yutte Stensgaard as Ullah
 Susan Baker as Kate
 Jennifer Baker as Ursula

Reception
Vincent Canby of The New York Times wrote: "(Director) Miller and his screen writer, Peter Draper, avoided any revealing psychological confrontations in favor of making one of those depressingly modish movies in which the sensations created by things like slick photography, beautiful nudes and intrusive soundtrack music become the substance of the film, instead of its context."

References

External links

1970 films
1970 drama films
Films directed by Robert Ellis Miller
Films scored by Richard Rodney Bennett
British drama films
Columbia Pictures films
Films set in London
Films set in Stockholm
Films set in Spain
Films shot at Shepperton Studios
Films based on British novels
1970s English-language films
1970s British films